The Smuggler's Daughter is a 1914 American silent comedy film featuring Oliver Hardy.

Plot

Cast
 Raymond McKee as Hans Schmidt
 Eva Bell as Gwendolyn
 Oliver Hardy as Gwendolyn's Father (as Babe Hardy)
 James Levering as Fisherman
 William H. Hopkins as Letter Carrier (as Bill Hopkins)
 John Edwards
 Frances Ne Moyer

See also
 Oliver Hardy filmography

External links

1914 films
American silent short films
American black-and-white films
1914 comedy films
1914 short films
Films directed by Jerold T. Hevener
Silent American comedy films
American comedy short films
1910s American films